Markaz-i Bihsūd District is one of the districts of Maidan Wardak Province in Afghanistan. It is located less than an hour-drive west of Kabul and south Bamyan. The main town in the district is Behsud. The district has an estimated population of 134,852 people, majority of which are ethnic Hazaras.

The Markazi Behsud is the largest district of Maidan Wardak Province with a number of villages. Most residents of the district are farmers and involved in agriculture. The chief of the district is Abdul Rahman Tawfiq.

The Hesa Awal Behsood District sits to the northeast of this district. Both are strongholds of Hazara militia forces who have engaged in guerrilla warfare with the Taliban and the Afghan National Security Forces (ANSF). One of these groups is led by Abdul Ghani Alipur (also known as Commander Shamshir), who was a fugitive of the former Afghan government; his followers used a rocket-propelled grenade to shoot down an Mil Mi-17 of the Afghan Air Force on March 18, 2021, which was transporting several members of the Afghan National Police. All nine ANSF members in the Mi-17 helicopter were killed, including the Afghan pilots.

Alipar's militia has continued battling the Taliban after it seized power in August 2021.  sporadic clashes were taking place between the militia and the Taliban.

See also
Districts of Afghanistan

References

External links
 Map showing Markazi Bihsud District

Hazarajat
Districts of Maidan Wardak Province